Badiar National Park is a national park in Guinea, on the border with Senegal and contiguous with Senegal's much larger Niokolo-Koba National Park. It was established on 30 May 1985 (by ordonnance N°124/PRG/85), partly in response to Senegal's concern about poaching in Niokolo-Koba National Park. Badiar is an International Union for Conservation of Nature Category II park.

There is also a buffer sector of  around the Mafou sector. The principal rivers are the Koulountou (one of the two main tributaries of the Gambia River) and the Mitji. The annual rainfall averages , mostly during the rainy season of June–October.

The park is an important ecosystem, with a large variety of vertebrate species and vascular plants. It is one of the three core areas of the Badiar Biosphere Reserve, established in 2002 and covering , that also includes the neighbouring forest of Southern Badiar and the Forest of Ndama. The terrain includes savanna, open woodlands and gallery forest. The eastern part of the park contains scrub woodland, while the western part is characterized by wooded savanna and open forest. Endangered plant species include Ceiba pentandra, Cassia sieberiana and Combretum micranthum. Endangered animal species found within the park include the Western red colobus, the common chimpanzee, the white stork, the African rock python and the ball python. Other resident species include the African elephant, the roan antelope, the kob, the leopard, the spotted hyena and the baboon.

References

Protected areas established in 1985
IUCN Category II
National parks of Guinea
Biosphere reserves of Guinea
Forests of Guinea
1985 establishments in Guinea